A Wonderful Life may refer to:
A Wonderful Life (Lara Fabian album) (2004)
A Wonderful Life (Mushroomhead album) (2020)
A Wonderful Life (film), a 1951 short film starring James Dunn
A Wonderful Life (musical), a 2005 musical based on the film It's a Wonderful Life
Harvest Moon: A Wonderful Life, a 2004 video game

See also
It's a Wonderful Life (disambiguation)
Wonderful Life (disambiguation)